Red Dead Redemption is a 2010 action-adventure game developed by Rockstar San Diego and published by Rockstar Games. A spiritual successor to 2004's Red Dead Revolver, it is the second game in the Red Dead series. Red Dead Redemption is set during the decline of the American frontier in the year 1911 and follows John Marston, a former outlaw whose wife and son are taken hostage by the government in ransom for his services as a hired gun. Having no other choice, Marston sets out to bring three members of his former gang to justice.

The game is played from a third-person perspective. The player may freely roam in its interactive open world, a fictionalized version of the Western United States and Northern Mexico, primarily by horseback and on foot. Gunfights emphasize a gunslinger gameplay mechanic called "Dead Eye" that allows players to mark multiple shooting targets on enemies in slow motion. The game makes use of a morality system, by which the player's actions in the game affect their character's levels of honor and fame and how other characters respond to the player. An online multiplayer mode is included with the game, allowing up to 16 players to engage in both cooperative and competitive gameplay in a recreation of the single-player setting.

The game's development lasted over five years, and it became one of the most expensive video games ever made. Rockstar improved its proprietary game engine to increase its technological capabilities. The development team conducted extensive research, including field trips to Washington, D.C. and analyzing classic Western films, to achieve realism while creating the game. The team hired professional actors to perform the body movements through motion capture. Red Dead Redemption features an original score composed by Bill Elm and Woody Jackson. The game's development received controversy following accusations of unethical working practices. The working hours and managerial style of the studio was met with public complaints from staff members.

Red Dead Redemption was released for the PlayStation 3 and Xbox 360 in May 2010. It received critical acclaim for its visuals, music, performances, gameplay, and narrative. It won several year-end accolades, including Game of the Year awards from several gaming publications, and is considered by critics as one of the best video games ever made. It had shipped around 23million copies by 2021, making it one of the best-selling video games. After the game's release, several downloadable content additions were released; Undead Nightmare, later released as a standalone game, added a new single-player campaign in which Marston searches for a cure for an infectious zombie plague. A prequel, Red Dead Redemption 2, was released in October 2018.

Gameplay 
Red Dead Redemption is a Western-themed action-adventure game played from a third-person perspective. The player controls John Marston and completes missions—linear scenarios with set objectives—to progress through the story; in the game's epilogue, the player controls John's son Jack. Outside of missions, players may freely roam the open world environment, consisting of the American states New Austin and West Elizabeth—fictionalized versions of the Western United States—and the fictional Mexican state of Nuevo Paraíso. Different breeds of horses are the main forms of transportation, each with different attributes. Horses must be tamed in the wild, stolen, or purchased in order to use them. The player can utilize trains and carriages for quick travel. The game's undeveloped land makes up the largest portion of the game world, featuring various rugged and vast landscapes with occasional travelers, bandits, and wildlife. Urban settlements range from isolated farmhouses to crowded towns.

The player can witness and partake in random events as they explore the game world, including public hangings, ambushes, pleas for assistance, encounters with strangers, ride-by shootings, and dangerous animal attacks. Optional side activities are also available, such as dueling, bounty hunting, herb collecting, gambling, and hunting. Red Dead Redemption uses an Honor system, which measures how the player's actions are perceived in terms of morality. Morally positive deeds, such as capturing an outlaw alive or saving a stranger, will add up to the player's Honor. Conversely, negative choices such as murder will subtract from the player's Honor. This works in conjunction with the Fame system, which affects how non-player characters (NPCs) react to the player based on their Honor. If the player has high Honor, NPCs will greet them and they will receive discounts in some stores; if low, NPCs will act insecure and establishments may close their doors. The player can disguise themselves by wearing a bandana when performing criminal acts.

Gunfights are an essential gameplay mechanic in Red Dead Redemption. The player can take cover, target a specific person or animal, blindfire, and free aim. Individual body parts can also be targeted, in order to take targets down non-lethally. Weapons consist of revolvers, pistols, rifles, shotguns, knives, explosives, and lassos. Aiming utilizes a gunslinger gameplay mechanic known as Dead Eye, a targeting system that allows the player to slow down time and mark targets. Once the targeting sequence ends, the player fires to all marked locations in extremely quick succession. The Dead Eye system upgrades and grants more abilities as the player progresses through the story.

The game introduces the bounty system, a crime-governing mechanic inspired by Grand Theft Autos wanted system. When the player commits a crime, witnesses run to the nearest police station. The player can either bribe or kill them before they reach the station, negating any consequences. Once the law is alerted, the Wanted meter appears with a bounty set on the player's head. The bounty grows higher as the player commits more crimes, and more lawmen will be sent to hunt them. After committing enough crime, the U.S. Marshals or Mexican Army will be sent to the player's location. To evade law enforcement in pursuit, the player must escape a circular zone or kill all lawmen in a town. If the player escapes, bounty hunters will continue to track after them. The bounty will remain on their head until they pay it at a telegraph station or present a pardon letter.

The online multiplayer allows up to 16 players to engage in competitive and cooperative gameplay in a recreation of the single-player setting. Each game begins with a Mexican standoff, of which the survivors can move to any part of the battlefield in preparation for respawning enemies. Event types include deathmatch scenarios and capture the flag variants. Crates in the environment contain extra weapons, ammo, and other powerups. Players can level up and complete weapon challenges which earn them rewards such as new character models, golden weapon skins, new titles, and new breeds of animal mounts. Multiplayer also features open-world gameplay, wherein players can form or join a group of up to eight players in a "posse" group and partake in hunting or attack other gangs or posses. In some game modes, players are unable to kill each other.

Plot 
In 1911, the family of former outlaw John Marston (Rob Wiethoff) is kidnapped by Bureau of Investigation agents, Edgar Ross (Jim Bentley) and Archer Fordham (David Wilson Barnes), who force him to hunt down his former gang members in exchange for his family's return. John first goes after former ally Bill Williamson (Steve J. Palmer), who now leads his own gang that terrorizes the residents of New Austin. He arrives at Williamson's stronghold at Fort Mercer, but fails to persuade him to surrender, resulting in John being shot and left for dead. Rescued by local rancher Bonnie MacFarlane (Kimberly Irion), he helps her with several jobs around her farm, while formulating a plan to attack Williamson's gang. John makes a number of allies to help him carry out the attack, including U.S. Marshal Leigh Johnson (Anthony De Longis), con artist Nigel West Dickens (Don Creech), treasure hunter Seth Briars (Kevin Glikmann), and an arms smuggler known as "Irish" (K. Harrison Sweeney). Ultimately, John and his allies storm Fort Mercer and kill all of Williamson's men, but learn that Williamson has fled to Mexico to seek help from Javier Escuella (Antonio Jaramillo), another former member of John's gang. John parts ways with his allies and travels to Mexico.

Upon his arrival in Nuevo Paraíso, John becomes involved in a local civil war between Colonel Agustín Allende (Gary Carlos Cervantes), the state's tyrannical ruler, and Abraham Reyes (Josh Segarra), the leader of a rebellion against Allende's government. John works with both sides in exchange for help in tracking down his targets. When Allende decides to turn on him, John is rescued by Reyes and vows to aid the rebels in gaining an advantage. During a raid on a Mexican Army fortress, the rebels help him find Escuella, who reveals that Williamson is under Allende's protection. After killing or capturing Escuella, John hands him over to Ross and Fordham. Reyes eventually leads an assault on Allende's palace, and John helps him chase and execute Allende and Williamson when they attempt to flee. Leaving Reyes to rule Nuevo Paraíso and lead his revolution to Mexico's capital, John returns to the United States.

In Blackwater, Ross and Fordham enlist John's help in tracking down Dutch van der Linde (Benjamin Byron Davis), his former gang's leader and John's former mentor. Dutch has recently formed a gang with disaffected Native Americans, with whom he shares a hatred for the government and modernization. Aided by Ross's associates, John finds Dutch's stronghold in the mountains. After helping Ross and Fordham thwart Dutch's robbery of the Blackwater Bank, John partakes in the U.S. Army's assault on Dutch's stronghold. Chased to a cliff, Dutch concedes defeat and warns John that the Bureau will not give him peace, before committing suicide. Afterward, Ross honors their agreement and allows John to be reunited with his family.

Returning to his ranch, John reunites with his wife Abigail (Sophia Marzocchi), son Jack (Josh Blaylock) and former gang member Uncle (Spider Madison) to attempt an honest life again. However, this peace is short-lived as Ross betrays John and leads a U.S. Army unit in an attack on his ranch. John tries to fend them off, but the attacking force is too large, and Uncle is killed. John helps his family escape and stays to face the attackers, who shoot him to death and leave. In 1914, Jack buries Abigail next to John after she dies, before tracking down a newly-retired Ross to confront him about John's death. Jack kills Ross in a duel.

Themes and analysis 

Red Dead Redemption explores themes of the cycle of violence, faith, governmental control, the loss of innocence and freedom, manifest destiny, masculinity, social change, and redemption; it also received commentary for its representation of Native Americans and violence. IGNs Erik Brudvig considered it a commentary on modern political issues such as racism and immigration; writer Dan Houser said that the story was not intended as a satire of contemporary America, but that parallels were inevitable due to the similarities of the time period. Some scholars identified that the game conforms to neoliberal values, particularly in its depoliticizing of the sufferers of corporate greed, though one scholar conversely felt that it ridicules the selfishness of neoliberals. Matt Margini described the narrative as a tragedy, citing Aristotle's proposal that the hero is neither good nor evil and that "tragic heroes are tragic because they bring about their own fall, despite having good intentions".

Several scholars noted that, despite the use of the word "redemption" in the game's title, such a feat was impossible for John; Reid McCarter of Bullet Points Monthly described the use of the word as "bitterly ironic" due to the inability of reinvention for both the characters and the country. Margini wrote that the final chapter allowed the player to feel that they had achieved the promised redemption, only for it to be taken away by the story's end. Conversely, Kotakus Heather Alexandra felt that John achieved his redemption upon sacrificing himself to save his family. Benjamin J. Triana found that, while John's death "implies transcendence", it is not overtly sacrificial, nor does it represent John as a hero. Gamasutras Richard Clark considered the depiction of redemption to be "cynical and overly simple". Red Dead Redemption also explores the impacts of the cycle of violence, most notably represented through Jack's continuation of his father's failures by adopting the outlaw status. NPR's Jason Sheehan considered the game a tale of "the senselessness of violence used to solve violence begetting only more violence". M. Melissa Elston found that, like other modern media, it attempts to "reframe the violence and simplistic moral dualism of previous pop-cultural representations of the Old West". The game drew some commentary for its depiction of violence; Margini considered it justifiable since "violence means something". Timothy J. Welsh felt similarly, adding that it is "just a game", but recognized the worrisome nihilism it could perpetuate if generalized. Christopher Bartel rebutted this sentiment, expressing hesitancy at the moral justification of virtual murder and noting that "even hard-core gamers might balk at virtual sadism".

The game presents the ethos of the American Dream in its formation, in contrast with the modern-day representation in Grand Theft Auto IV (2008). While John's violent past rendered him unable to achieve redemption, it also impacted his son's own ability to achieve the American Dream as he becomes an outlaw like his father. The game also features commentary on freedom and control, and the manner in which societal change acts as a catalyst for losing one's control and compromising their morality. The journey from the open fields to the city of Blackwater represents civilization's control over the natural world, though the player lacks control during the opening sequence in which John leaves Blackwater, only gaining it when reentering the city later in the game. While Red Dead Redemption grants the player freedom, they ultimately lack control over the narrative as "being free to do things is not the same as being able to change things", an ideology that is directly reflected in John's inability to prevent his own death. Triana felt that the ending allowed the player to properly understand John's rejection of a developing society and institutions due to the misery endured from the government. The game also demonstrates the disparities of economic inequality; Sara Humphreys identified a connection between MacFarlane's Ranch and the class conflict of Johnson County, Wyoming in the late nineteenth century.

While marketing materials presented John as a traditional cowboy—isolated and violent, a "white, heteronormative, rugged individual"—his behaviour and ambitions in the narrative are generally unconventional. His ambiguity and internal conflict lead him to exhibit "weariness more than manliness". Regardless, John continues to perpetuate stereotypes in some instances; he continues to preserve lives in his missions for the government despite his bitter opposition to them, described as an enactment of Theodore Roosevelt's masculine ideals. Triana found the game's masculinity to be plural, with the male lead generally pitted against other men, though recognized that the dominance of the characters often shifted throughout the narrative. He also recognized that John's challenges reflected those of straight, cisgender men in the modern era. Margini blamed John's downfall on "the false promises of a world built on hypermasculine ideals", emphasized by John's unsuccessful attempts to adopt a new form of masculinity and play an empathetic father to Jack. Juho Tuominen described John as an idealist and Jack as "the educated youth, a version of a new kind of woke man". The representation of female characters is mixed; Bonnie MacFarlane is presented as "insightful and resourceful" instead of simply "a woman masquerading as a male figure", though still defers to simple domestic tasks in the presence of her father, and on one occasion becomes the damsel in distress. Meanwhile, Abigail is presented as "the good prostitute who serves as a handmaiden" and later becomes "the nagging wife", and other female characters exist simply to reflect back onto John, both positively and negatively.

In further opposition with the American Dream, the game's representation of Native Americans is bleak, cruel, and violent. Jodi A. Byrd identified that, in the game's title, "Red Dead" signalled the genocide of the Native Americans. McCarter of Bullet Points felt that, while the killing of Native Americans is explained in the context of the story, it is "a shaky rationale meant to echo the rhetoric" surrounding the genocide and forced relocation. Elston recognized the Native American character Nastas as an example of Gerald Vizenor's "manifest manners", a falsification of the indigenous experience being told as truth. Dr. Esther Wright proposed that Native American characters were included only to justify and complement the white characters' otherness as oppositional to the government and civilization, describing it as "a disingenuous oversimplification and (mis)use of the complexities of Native American genocide". She also identified that, while John is not overtly racist, his participation in an attack on an Indian reservation implicates him in "a micro-scale recreation of racist, genocidal violence". Margini considered that the representation could either be an example of dark satire, or "a crafty way of excusing their genocide at Marston's hand", aligned with a wider erasure seen in other Western media. Triana wrote that Native Americans "end up victims to the game's evil social forces" due to John's priority of reuniting with his family.

Development 

After the May 2004 release of Red Dead Revolver, publisher Rockstar Games wanted to create its own Western video game from scratch; it had acquired Revolver from Capcom in 2003 after years of development and completed development within nine months. Early development began in 2005, and full development commenced in 2006, following the formation of a core development team. Rockstar San Diego's 180-person team co-opted Rockstar's Leeds, New England, North, and Toronto studios to facilitate development between a full team of over 1,000. Having exhausted the use of previous hardware on other projects, Rockstar felt inspired after realizing the potential power of the PlayStation 3 and Xbox 360. The game's development received controversy following accusations of unethical working practices at Rockstar San Diego, including twelve-hour workdays and six-day weeks, with a lower-than-the-industry-average salary increase.

Red Dead Redemptions 1,500-page script was written in two years. Taking inspiration from films like The Wild Bunch (1969), High Plains Drifter (1973), Unforgiven (1992), and The Proposition (2005), the team felt that most Western fiction takes place between 1840 and 1880, and that Red Dead Redemptions setting in 1911 allowed a more intriguing analysis of the transformation from "the old West" into the modern world. Regarding the game's depiction of violence, the team wanted it to "feel slightly raw and unpleasant", attempting realism without exaggeration. The open world was created to represent iconic features of the American frontier. The team organized field trips to Washington, D.C., visiting the Library of Congress and the National Archives Building, captured a multitude of photographs, and analyzed various classic Western films, television shows, and novels. The team considered creating the open world one of the most technically demanding aspect of the game's production, in terms of filling the world with enough content to interest players.

Like other projects since Rockstar Games Presents Table Tennis (2006), the game uses the proprietary Rockstar Advanced Game Engine (RAGE) to perform animation and rendering tasks, and the Euphoria and Bullet engines for further animation and environment rendering tasks. Overhauling the potential processing power of RAGE allowed the game to create a high level of detail, including realistic animations and detailed textures. The potential power of the PlayStation 3 and Xbox 360 experienced through the development kits motivated the team to begin development, and to create a game that could fully render the countryside, which was difficult to achieve on previous hardware. The developers at San Diego sought guidance from other Rockstar studios experienced with developing open worlds, particularly Grand Theft Auto developer Rockstar North. The game was envisioned to improve the core mechanics of Red Dead Revolver by scaling it up to the standard of other Rockstar games, maintaining key gameplay elements like the Dead Eye and dueling mechanics but majorly overhauling the experience otherwise. In particular, the team faced a challenge in creating realistic movement for the horse, resulting in the engagement of a stunt horse to simulate movement for the designers.

As the story developed, a range of characters were organically created based on the period; Red Dead Redemption features around 450 characters. The game required a large amount of character dialogue in order to feel alive, comparable to Rockstar's previous game Grand Theft Auto IV. Researchers at Rockstar developed a style guide based on real sayings of the time period. Rockstar hired Rod Edge as the full-time director to handle the game's performances, recorded using motion capture technology, with additional dialogue and sound effects recorded in a studio; the performance capture was recorded in Santa Monica, California. After an audition process, Rob Wiethoff was selected to portray John Marston. John was developed to be a nuanced character, as opposed to an explicit villain or hero, and a "family man". Steve J. Palmer, who portrayed Bill Williamson, felt that John and Bill represented siblings in their former gang, while Dutch van der Linde was more of a parental figure. Benjamin Byron Davis, who portrayed Dutch, was told that Dutch was a well-read, charismatic former gang leader who had "lost his mind".

Red Dead Redemption is one of the first games by Rockstar to use an original score. Music supervisor Ivan Pavlovich cited the large scale of the game as one of the largest difficulties when producing the score; to achieve an effective gaming experience, the game could not solely feature licensed music, like previous Rockstar games. In 2008, Rockstar engaged musicians Bill Elm and Woody Jackson, who collaborated to compose approximately 200 tracks for the game over 15 months. The original score and subsequent album were both recorded and mixed at Jackson's studio, Electro-Vox Recording Studios in Los Angeles, and mastered at Capitol Studios. When researching music for inspiration, Jackson found that there was no "Western sound" in 1911; he felt that the soundtracks of 1960s Western films, such as Ennio Morricone's work on the Dollars Trilogy, was more representative of Western music. Rockstar also consulted musicians who played traditional Western instruments, such as harmonica player Tommy Morgan. The game also features vocal performances by Ashtar Command, José González, Jamie Lidell, and William Elliott Whitmore.

Release and promotion 

An early trailer for an untitled Western project by Rockstar Games for PlayStation 3 was shown at Sony's E3 conference in May 2005; it was a technology demonstrate of RAGE, and theorized to be a sequel to Red Dead Revolver. Rockstar officially announced Red Dead Redemption on February 3, 2009. The debut trailer was released on May 6, 2009, introducing the game's protagonist. The game received an extensive and expensive marketing campaign, during which Rockstar partnered with several companies and media outlets, including IGN, GameSpot, LoveFilm, Microsoft, and YouTube. To encourage pre-order sales, Rockstar collaborated with several retail outlets to provide pre-order bonuses, including exclusive in-game horses, outfits, and weapons. Rockstar also released a special edition of the game in special packaging, with a copy of the soundtrack. The game was exhibited at PAX East in late March 2010, with a 15–30 minute playable demonstration. Rockstar released a Facebook application, Red Dead Redemption: Gunslingers, in April 2010. The following month, Red Dead Redemption: The Man from Blackwater, a machinima short film directed by John Hillcoat, aired in the United States on the television network Fox. The game missed its original projected late 2009 and April 2010 release dates, pushed back to May 18, 2010, in North America, and May 21 internationally, citing the "optimal time frame" for release.

Downloadable content (DLC) for the game was released following its launch, with focus on maps and game types suggested by the community. Outlaws to the End, released on June 22, 2010, added six cooperative side missions for multiplayer. Legends and Killers was released on August 10, 2010, and added multiplayer characters from Red Dead Revolver, as well as new map locations and a Tomahawk weapon. On September 21, 2010, Liars and Cheats added competitive multiplayer modes, minigames, characters, and a weapon. Hunting and Trading, released on October 12, 2010, added a jackalope to the game's world, and some additional outfits. Undead Nightmare adds a single-player campaign, set in a non-canonical, zombie apocalypse-themed alternate reality with ghost towns and cemeteries full of zombies, wherein John searches for a cure to the zombie outbreak. It was released on October 26, 2010, as DLC and in late November as a standalone expansion pack. Myths and Maverick released for free on September 13, 2011, adding additional characters and locations to the multiplayer. A Game of the Year Edition containing all downloadable content was released for both PlayStation 3 and Xbox 360 on October 11, 2011, in North America and on October 14, 2011, internationally.

Microsoft added the game, along with Undead Nightmare, to its backwards compatibility list for Xbox One, the successor to the Xbox 360, in July 2016. Red Dead Redemption had been one of the most requested titles for the feature. The game's sales position on Amazon.com spiked following the announcement. The release runs at a smoother frame rate on the Xbox One. In April 2018, the game received an update as an "Xbox One X enhanced" title, making the original game code playable at 4K resolution (an increase from the game's original 720p resolution) and with some graphical improvements on the high-end revision of Xbox One, called Xbox One X. The Xbox Series X and Series S can also play the game, with the higher-end Series X running it with its Xbox One X-specific enhancements. Sony added Red Dead Redemption and Undead Nightmare to its PlayStation Now cloud gaming subscription service in December 2016, which allowed them to be played on PlayStation 4, PlayStation 5, and Windows; they were removed in October 2022.

Reception

Critical response 

Red Dead Redemption received "universal acclaim" from critics, according to review aggregator Metacritic. It is among the highest-rated games on Metacritic, and is ranked as the fifth-highest rated PlayStation 3 and seventh-highest rated Xbox 360 game. Brudvig of IGN described Red Dead Redemption as "a must-play" and "one of the deepest, most fun, and most gorgeous games around"; GamePros Will Herring named it Rockstar's best game to date, a culmination of its previous successes. Simon Parkin of Eurogamer concluded that Red Dead Redemption was "a blockbuster video game: a string of cinematic set-pieces and flawed yet endearing characters nestled within an orthodox narrative structure, seasoned with generous pinches of extra-curricular tasks".

IGNs Brudvig identified that Red Dead Redemptions narrative themes reflected modern society, including racism, government power, and immigration; Will Tuttle of GameSpy found that they occasionally felt "preachy", but were typically more nuanced than expected. Mike Channell of Official Xbox Magazine (OXM) considered the death of the Wild West a pressure that loomed over the narrative. Matt Bertz of Game Informer felt that the narrative momentum suffered from the length of the missions in Mexico, but praised the game's ending for using a "sense of immersiveness only a video game can impart". IGNs Brudvig similarly lauded the game's climax as one of the best in gaming. Herring of GamePro was surprised by the likability of John Marston, describing him as "one of the more sympathetic antiheroes in recent memory". He also felt that, despite being based on caricatures of Spaghetti Western films, the game's secondary characters were "interesting enough that they never feel contrived"; conversely, Paste reviewer Kirk Hamilton opined that the "clichéd and unlikeable" supporting characters undermined the narrative. GameSpots Justin Calvert applauded the detail of the "deeply flawed but very likable" Marston, noting that his scars and outfit made him feel more believable. Brudvig of IGN wrote that Marston's motivations were occasionally confusing and felt alienated from the narrative.

Game Informers Bertz named Red Dead Redemption the "best-looking Rockstar game to date". IGNs Brudvig lauded the environmental details and noted that the game's dynamic events and weather provided a rich experience for players. GamePros Herring considered the game's open world superior to its contemporaries, appreciating the change from Grand Theft Auto IVs "brown, muddy 'realism' filter". Tuttle of GameSpy named the game's environment its most impressive element, praising the ecology and geography. Parkin of Eurogamer noted that the world was as dense as Grand Theft Auto IVs Liberty City while maintaining the Western theme of isolation. Edge felt that the world felt emptier than Liberty City, but "Rockstar proves far better at guiding your eye to the relevant parts". Reviewers praised the side missions that appear throughout the game world; Scott Sharkey of 1Up.com described them as "perfect little micro-dramas". Edge wrote that the variety in side content avoided the repetition present in Assassin's Creed.

Bertz of Game Informer wrote that Red Dead Redemption "tranpose[d] the Grand Theft Auto gameplay template onto a Wild West setting". Good Game reviewer Stephanie Bendixsen felt that the game used the best elements of Grand Theft Auto IV. GameSpots Calvert lauded the bounty system for adding consequence to the player's actions. The horseback controls received praise from critics; GamePros Herring found that they added authenticity. Parkin of Eurogamer named the relationship between the player and their horse as among the game's greatest successes, but noted some awkward controls, particularly when running. Edge felt that the Dead Eye mechanic "puts gunplay on a pedestal"; Brudvig of IGN wrote that it "makes you feel like a classic gunslinger". Eurogamers Parkin compared the combat favorably to Rockstar's previous titles, particularly praising the horseback shootouts, but criticized the "sticky and outdated" cover mechanic. Bertz of Game Informer found the aiming and cover system to be as "airtight" as in Grand Theft Auto IV, and lauded the uniqueness of the weapons and animations. OXMs Channell commended the variety and handling of the weaponry. G4s Jake Gaskill opined that the Dead Eye "can feel a bit too powerful at times".

GameSpy writer Tuttle found that the minimalist score added to the world's authenticity. Herring of GamePro compared the soundtrack favorably to Ennio Morricone's work on the Dollars Trilogy. Eurogamers Parkin named it "standout", praising the use of multiple instruments. Calvert of GameStop described the soundtrack as "superb", though noted that it "occasionally swells up without reason". PSM3s Andy Hartup wrote that the music complemented the action and scenery, never feeling intrusive. Pastes Hamilton thought that the score was integrated into the world seamlessly. The game's vocal tracks also received praise; the scene wherein Marston enters Mexico was described as "beautiful" by GamesRadars Matt Cundy due to the use of the song "Far Away" by José González.

Red Dead Redemptions multiplayer received mixed commentary. Bertz of Game Informer described it as "a fully featured complement" to the single-player. GamePros Herring praised the variety of modes and open gameplay, but noted that it put more responsibility on the players for keeping the game interesting. Calvert of GameSpot felt that there was a lack in customization options for players. Sharkey of 1Up.com criticized the leveling mechanics. G4s Jake Gaskill echoed this sentiment, noting that the game often respawns players in close proximity to the opposition.

Accolades 

Red Dead Redemption received multiple nomination and awards from gaming publications. At the Spike Video Game Awards in 2010, the game received ten nominations and went on to win four awards: Game of the Year, Best Song in a Game ("Far Away"), Best Original Score, and Best DLC (Undead Nightmare). The game earned eight nominations at the 14th Annual Interactive Achievement Awards and won five, including Action Game of the Year and Outstanding Character Performance for Wiethoff. At the 11th Annual Game Developers Choice Awards, Red Dead Redemption won four awards of five nominations, including Game of the Year and Best Game Design. It received ten nominations at the 9th Annual Game Audio Network Guild Awards, of which it won four: Audio of the Year, Music of the Year, Best Interactive Score, and Best Dialogue. The game was not nominated for any of the jury-based awards at the British Academy Games Awards as Rockstar did not submit it for consideration. The game appeared on several year-end lists of the best games of 2010, receiving Game of the Year wins from outlets such as 1Up.com, Computer and Video Games, Digital Spy, Gamasutra, Game Informer, GameSpot, GameSpy, GamesRadar, Good Game, The Guardian, Kotaku, and VentureBeat.

Sales 
Prior to the release of Red Dead Redemption, Michael Pachter of Wedbush Securities estimated that it would need to sell at least 1.75million units (generating ) to break-even, and 3.5million units to earn a profit. According to Joystiq, a source at Rockstar claimed that the game required four million sales to recoup development costs, but that the publisher expected to lose money and was more interested in proving the talent of Rockstar San Diego.

Red Dead Redemption was the best-selling game of May 2010, selling over 1.5million copies, according to the NPD Group. It sold over five million copies in its first three weeks. In June 2010, distributor Take-Two Interactive CEO Ben Feder stated that the game was nearing profitability for the company. By September 2010, the game had shipped 6.9million copies, exceeding Take-Two's performance expectations for the quarter. It was the fifth best-selling game of 2010; the Xbox 360 version was the ninth best-selling individual platform game. The game sold 8 million copies by February 2011, contributing to a 7.7 percent profit increase for Take-Two for the quarter. It shipped 8.5million copies in its first year, and over 11million copies by August 2011, 2million of which were retail units of Undead Nightmare. By February 2017, Red Dead Redemption had shipped over 15million units. As of September 2021, the game and its prequel had shipped almost 62million copies combined, with Red Dead Redemption around 23million units shipped, making it one of the best-selling video games.

The game topped the charts in the United Kingdom following its release, maintaining the top position until the release of Lego Harry Potter: Years 1–4 in June 2010. According to GfK Chart-Track, 65 percent of UK sales in the first week were on Xbox 360. The game was the fourth best-selling game in the United Kingdom in 2010, as well as the fourth best-selling PlayStation 3 and Xbox 360 title. The game sold over 95,000 units in its first week in Japan; the PlayStation 3 version was the fourth best-selling game of the week with over 70,000 sales, while the Xbox 360 version was seventh with over 25,000 sales.

Legacy 
Critics concurred that Red Dead Redemption was among the best games of the seventh generation of video game consoles. Eurogamers Dan Whitehead hoped the eighth generation of consoles would offer "similarly powerful experiences". In September 2013, IGN ranked Red Dead Redemption the fifth-best PlayStation 3 and seventh-best Xbox 360 game. In February 2015, GamesRadar ranked it sixth on its list of best games, recognizing its superiority in narrative over Rockstar's 2013 title Grand Theft Auto V. In July 2015, the game ranked tenth on USgamers "The 15 Best Games Since 2000" list; Jaz Rignall described it as "one of the finest open world games so far seen", praising its gameplay, visuals, soundtrack, narrative, and characterization. GamesRadar+ named it the fourth-best game of the decade in December 2019, comparing it favorably to other sandbox games Grand Theft Auto V and The Witcher 3: Wild Hunt (2015). The game ranked high on several best game lists determined by the public; it featured seventh on Good Games "Top 100 Games" list, and fifth on IGNs "Games of a Generation" list, as voted by the program and website's respective audiences.

A prequel, Red Dead Redemption 2, was released in October 2018 for PlayStation 4 and Xbox One. The game's main story is set in 1899, 12 years before Red Dead Redemption, and depicts John's life as part of Dutch's gang alongside Bill, Javier, Uncle, Abigail, and Jack. Players control fellow gang member Arthur Morgan.

Notes

References

Bibliography

External links 

 
 

 
2010 video games
Action-adventure games
Articles containing video clips
D.I.C.E. Award for Action Game of the Year winners
Euphoria (software) games
Game Developers Choice Award for Game of the Year winners
Hunting in video games
Interactive Achievement Award winners
Multiplayer and single-player video games
Open-world video games
PlayStation 3 games
Rockstar Advanced Game Engine games
Rockstar Games games
Spike Video Game Awards Game of the Year winners
Take-Two Interactive games
Video games about revenge
Video games developed in the United States
Video games produced by Dan Houser
Video games scored by Woody Jackson
Video games set in 1911
Video games set in 1914
Video games set in Mexico
Video games set in the United States
Video games with downloadable content
Video games with expansion packs
Video games with time manipulation
Video games written by Dan Houser
Western (genre) video games
Works about atonement
Xbox 360 games